Jerome Louis (born 23 September 1987) is a Namibian footballer who currently plays for Botswana side Township Rollers F.C.

He joined Township Rollers in 2013 from Black Africa S.C., where he became top goalscorer of the Namibia Premier League in 2008–09, 2009–10 and 2011–12. He also won the league title in 2010–11, 2011–12, 2012–13 and the Botswana title in 2013–14. To date he has been capped thirteen times for the Namibia national football team.

Honours

Individual
Mascom Top 8 Cup Top Goalscorer: 2014

References

1987 births
Living people
Namibia Premier League players
Namibia international footballers
Black Africa S.C. players
Township Rollers F.C. players
Namibian expatriate footballers
Expatriate footballers in Botswana
Association football forwards
Footballers from Windhoek
Namibian men's footballers